The Lombardia Trophy, also known as Memorial Anna Grandolfi, is an annual international figure skating competition. It is held in September in Sesto San Giovanni, Italy. In some years, the event is part of the ISU Challenger Series. Medals may be awarded in the disciplines of men's singles, ladies' singles, pair skating, and ice dancing on the senior, junior, and novice levels.

Senior medalists
CS: ISU Challenger Series

Men

Women

Pairs

Ice dancing

Junior medalists

Men

Ladies

Pairs

Advanced novice medalists

Men

Ladies

References

External links
 Federazione Italiana Sport del Ghiaccio (Italian Ice Sports Federation) 

 
International figure skating competitions hosted by Italy
ISU Challenger Series